Edmund Charles Cook was an American basketball player and coach.  He played for the Indiana Hoosiers men's basketball team in the 1906–07 season and returned as a player in the 1907–08 season.  After being declared academically ineligible, he took over as the head basketball coach for the 1907–08 season, compiling a record of 9–6.  He later coached the basketball team at Franklin College in Franklin, Indiana for the 1910–11 and 1911–12 seasons, compiling a record of 16–9.

References

External links
 Eddie Cook at College Basketball at Sports-Reference.com
 Indiana University Basketball Encyclopedia, at pages 134-137

Year of birth missing
Year of death missing
Place of birth missing
Forwards (basketball)
Franklin Grizzlies men's basketball coaches
Indiana Hoosiers men's basketball coaches
Indiana Hoosiers men's basketball players
American men's basketball players